Moses Veale (November 9, 1832 - July 27, 1917) was an American soldier, attorney and Medal of Honor recipient. After being awarded the Medal of Honor for actions at Wauhatchie, Tennessee during the American Civil War he served as the United States attorney for the territory of Montana. He served multiple positions through the years and was nominated for State Senator of Pennsylvania in 1876.

Civil War 
Veale joined the 109th Pennsylvania Infantry as a second lieutenant on 8 November 1861. He was assistant provost marshal on the staff of General Christopher C. Augur and assistant commissary Musters and aide-de-campe for General John W. Geary. He had achieved the rank of captain by the date of his Medal of Honor action, receiving the commission on 4 April 1863. The Medal of Honor was awarded 17 January 1897 for gallantry in action on 28 October 1863. The Citation reads - 'Gallantry in action; manifesting throughout the engagement coolness, zeal, judgment, and courage. His horse was shot from under him and he was hit by four enemy bullets.'

Veale fought in numerous battles such as Antietam, Gettysburg, Battle of Cedar Mountain. Following the Battle of Cedar Mountain Veale was captured and held in Libby Prison until he was exchanged on 30 September 1862. He was discharged as a Major on 8 June 1865. Prior to his discharge he received a brevet rank of colonel on 16 January 1865.

Later life 
Following the war he stayed some time in Montana, first as the United States attorney for the territory of Montana then as clerk of Indian affairs and finally was appointed adjutant general of Montana with a rank of brigadier on 8 January 1868. 

Upon his return to Philadelphia in 1876, the Democratic party nominated him for State Senator of the fifth senatorial district. In 1881 the city of Philadelphia nominated him for recorder of deeds. On 15 April 1884, Governor Pattison made Veale the Health Officer of Philadelphia.

Death 
Moses Veale died on July 27, 1917 in Philadelphia, Pennsylvania and was then interred in West Laurel Hill Cemetery.

References 

1832 births
1917 deaths
American Civil War recipients of the Medal of Honor
People from Philadelphia
People from Bridgeton, New Jersey
United States Attorneys for the District of Montana